Basti Haji Gul Muhammad is a populated place in Pakistan. It is located near Bhong, and is mainly inhabited by the members of the Kosh clan.

References 

Populated places in Rahim Yar Khan District